Parassala railway station (Code: PASA) is a railway station in Thiruvananthapuram district, Kerala and falls under the Thiruvananthapuram railway division of the Southern Railway zone, Indian Railways. It is the southernmost railway station in Kerala and simultaneously marks the beginning of Kanyakumari district, Tamil Nadu at Kaliyakkavilai, therefore serving both Kerala and Tamil Nadu border areas of the region.

Railway stations in Thiruvananthapuram district
Thiruvananthapuram railway division